Long Ridge is a hill located in the Santa Cruz Mountains in the San Francisco Bay Area, California.
The hill is the highest point in San Mateo County. Some snow falls on the mountain during the winter.

The Long Ridge Open Space Preserve is named for this ridge.

See also 
 List of highest points in California by county

References 

Landforms of San Mateo County, California
Hills of California
Santa Cruz Mountains